CMLL Día de Muertos (Spanish for "Day of the Dead") is the collective name of a series of annually occurring lucha libre (or professional wrestling) supercard shows promoted by Mexican professional wrestling promotion Consejo Mundial de Lucha Libre (CMLL). Starting in 2014, CMLL has held specially themed shows to celebrate Día de Muertos with a special edition of their CMLL Super Viernes show closest to November 2. Some years the celebrations extended to shows held on Saturday and Sunday as well but the focal point has been the Friday night shows in Arena México. There has been a total of eight events promoted focusing on the Día de Muertos celebration, with the first taking place in 2014.

The October 31, 2014 Día de Muertos show was the first of CMLL's Dia de los Muertos celebrations and began a tradition of CMLL holding a major show to celebrate the Latin American holiday. As part of their Dia de los Muerte celebrations CMLL admitted all children in costumes for free for the show. CMLL held a second Dia de los Muerte celebration on Sunday November 2 as well. Both shows included the Edcanes, CMLL's ring girls and various wrestlers dressed up in traditional Día de Muertos garb. In 2014, CMLL also turned the basement of Arena México into a haunted house attraction before each show.

Dates, venues, and main events

References

 
Recurring events established in 2014